The Colonial Clash was an annual college football rivalry game played between the University of Massachusetts Amherst (UMass) and the University of New Hampshire (UNH). The two teams first played each other in 1897, and met annually from 1952 through 2011. The rivalry was branded as the Colonial Clash beginning in 2010. In 2012, UMass transitioned to the Football Bowl subdivision (FBS) of NCAA Division I, leaving the future of the rivalry in question. In 74 playings, UMass has won 43 games, UNH has won 28 games, and there have been three ties. Beginning with the 1986 playing, the MVP of the game was awarded the Bill Knight Trophy.

History
The first game played between the two schools took place on October 2, 1897, in Amherst, Massachusetts. Massachusetts won the game by a score of 10–4. At the time, UMass was known as Massachusetts Agricultural College and New Hampshire was officially New Hampshire College of Agriculture and the Mechanic Arts. They had formed a loose association with other public colleges in New England such as present day UConn and Rhode Island for the purpose of scheduling football matchups between the schools.

The colleges continued to schedule matches intermittently through 1922, but then had a 30-year hiatus until next meeting in 1952. They then met annually through the 2011 season, along with one playoff game as part of the 2006 postseason.

In August 2010, the matchup was branded as the "Colonial Clash", coincident with an arrangement to have the game played at Gillette Stadium in Foxborough, Massachusetts, during the 2010 and 2011 seasons. The 2010 matchup, a 39–13 win by New Hampshire, was the first college football game played at Gillette, the home stadium of the NFL's New England Patriots. The 2011 game, the second (and to date, most recent) playing under the Colonial Clash branding, was also won by UNH, 27–21.

From 1958 through 1989, UMass won 26 of the meetings, losing only six times, including only one instance of back-to-back losses to their rival (1975 and 1976). The most successful run for New Hampshire occurred from 1990 to 2002, when the Wildcats won 10 matchups and lost only three.

In 2012, UMass moved up to the Football Bowl Subdivision (FBS), the NCAA's highest level of college football.  The Minutemen joined the Mid-American Conference (MAC) at that time, then in 2016 became an independent. UNH remained in the Colonial Athletic Association (CAA) of the Football Championship Subdivision (FCS). No meetings between the programs have been scheduled since 2011, leaving the future of the rivalry in doubt.

Game results

See also  
 List of NCAA college football rivalry games

References

External links
 Colonial Clash Promo (10/23/10) via YouTube
 2010 Colonial Clash via YouTube
 Colonial Clash 2011 (CSN-NE) via YouTube

College football rivalries in the United States
New Hampshire Wildcats football
UMass Minutemen football